Anita Schäfer (born 9 July 1951) is a German politician of the Christian Democratic Union (CDU) who served as a member of the Bundestag from the state of Rhineland-Palatinate from 1998 until 2021. She represented the constituency of Pirmasens.

Political career 
Schäfer became a member of the Bundestag in the 1998 German federal election. In parliament, she served on the Defense Committee.

Ahead of the Christian Democrats’ leadership election, Schäfer publicly endorsed in 2020 Friedrich Merz to succeed Annegret Kramp-Karrenbauer as the party's chair.

In August 2020, Schäfer announced that she would not stand in the 2021 federal elections but instead resign from active politics by the end of the parliamentary term.

References

External links 

  
 Bundestag biography 

1951 births
Living people
Members of the Bundestag for Rhineland-Palatinate
Female members of the Bundestag
21st-century German women politicians
Members of the Bundestag 2017–2021
Members of the Bundestag 2013–2017
Members of the Bundestag 2009–2013
Members of the Bundestag 2005–2009
Members of the Bundestag 2002–2005
Members of the Bundestag 1998–2002
Members of the Bundestag for the Christian Democratic Union of Germany
20th-century German women